Dharangaon is a city and a municipal council in the Jalgaon district in the Indian state of Maharashtra. AND IT IS THE Dharangaon is also the tehsil headquarters in Jalgaon district. The majority of the population is from the Marathas (Patil), Mali (Phul), Rajput (Purbhe), Dhangar, Badgujar and Teli communities. Dharangaon is the birthplace of the Marathi poet Balkavi .

History
Dharangaon was formerly known as Mina Nagar. At the time of the Moghal conquest in the 10th century, Dharangaon was famous for its jirifaf and bhiran clothing. During the seventeenth century, under the reign of Dongong, Dorongon, and Drongom, it was mentioned by multiple sources as a trade center of considerable importance. In 1674, English settlers established a factory in the town. The following March, the town was plundered by King Chhatrapati Shivaji. Four years later in 1679, King Shivaji joined forces with the Raja of Berar and again plundered Dharangaon, which at that time was one of the most flourishing places in the country. In 1683 the Drongom investment was 10,000 pieces broad bastas, 10,000 pieces sevgazis, and 100,000 lbs. (2500 mans) of turmeric. In 1685 King Sambhaji plundered the town, burning or pillaging every house. The factors at Dharangaon had but two hours to escape. Under the Marathas, Dharangaon suffered much from Bhil raids and was the scene of one of the Bhil massacres by which the Marathas vainly attempted to keep order.

It came into British possession in 1800, and from 1825 to 1830, Lieutenant, afterward Sir James, Outram busied himself in raising the Bhil Corps. In 1844 two American planters, Mr. Blount of Gorakhpur and Mr. Simpson of Madras, who had been appointed superintendents of cotton experiments, set up saw-gins. In 1845 a screw press was built, but because of its costliness proved to be a failure.

In 1850 gins, nineteen in number, were hired to Ritchie Stewart Add and Co. of Bombay, who had established an agency, and a further supply of twenty-one was made for them. In 1854 the office of superintendent was abolished, and only a small establishment was kept to take charge of the gins. Out of these nineteen had been sold, a few hired out, and fifty-nine remained ready for 'disposal without any applicants. In 1855 Government established a factory with ninety-three saw gins under the management of a European overseer; merchants and cultivators were charged £1 (Rs. 10) a month for the hire of a gin. But the experiment proved costly, and after a time was given up. In 1865 120 gins were available, and an establishment kept at a yearly cost of £144 (Rs. 1440), an outlay not nearly covered by the income realized from the gins. Dharangaon, a municipal town in Jalgaon District, 57 km North-east of Dhulia, contained, in 1872, 11,807 inhabitants, and in 1879 had a municipal income of £438 (Rs. 4380). In the 18th century, various Rajput communities came to Dharangaon, primarily from Bayas and Chauhan. Dynasty also referred as "Purbhe"(initially "Purve" referring to the direction "East" In Marathi - "Purva"). These communities came from "Chandavad Fort" as they were in service of that fort.

Demographics
 India census, Dharangaon had a population of 33,625. Males constituted 51% and females 49%. Dharangaon has an average literacy rate of 70%, higher than the national average of 59.5%: male literacy is 74% and, female literacy is 57%. In Dharangaon, 13% of the population is under 6.

Most of the people communicate in Ahirani, a dialect of Marathi.

Economy 
Agriculture is the main occupation. Major crops include cotton, corn, wheat, jawar, banana and sugarcane.

Trade in cotton and oilseed is conducted with Jalgaon, a railway station about twenty miles to the east. Many Dharangaon merchants have agents in Jalgaon. In the past Dharangaon paper and cloth were in high demand, and while the weaving of coarse cloth still gives employment to more than 100 looms, paper manufacture has since ceased.
Dharangaon is also having cotton Ginning Factories producing around 5 lakh cotton bales of 170 kg Annually. Some of the major cotton factories are Shreeji Ginning Factory , S K Cotton Industries , Durgesh Impex .

Masala is one of the major products. Zope Bandhu masala is one of the leading masala factories, which provides masalas such as chicken masala, mutton masala, Shev Bhaji masala, Lahsun chutney and Panipuri masala.

Geography 
Many of the houses in Dharangaon are built of stone and mortar. The streets are narrow and irregular and the lanes are dirty and crooked. One large pond is north of the town and another is to the west near Outram's bungalow. These are used only for cattle and for washing clothes. The town lacks drinking water. In the bed of the stream which flows through the town are the remains of old dams.

Transport
Dharangaon railway station provides rail connectivity. Dharangaon is served by Western Railway between Surat and Bhusawal.

Dharangaon is located on State Highway No-6.
The nearest airport is 43 km to Jalgaon.

References

Cities and towns in Jalgaon district
Talukas in Maharashtra